489th may refer to:

489th Bombardment Group, inactive United States Army Air Force unit
489th Bombardment Squadron, active United States Air Force unit

See also
489 (number)
489, the year 489 (CDLXXXIX) of the Julian calendar
489 BC